Ovidiu Stîngă (born 5 December 1972) is a retired Romanian professional footballer and manager.

Club career
Born in Craiova, Stîngă began his football career at Viitorul Craiova. In 1990, he made his league debut for Universitatea Craiova at the age of 17, in a match against Corvinul Hunedoara. By the end of the season he was loaned to Jiul IELIF Craiova, and returned in the summer of 1991 to U Craiova. In the 1992–93 season he was the team's best player and took third place in the league and his side won the Cupa României.

In summer 1995, he went abroad to Spain at UD Salamanca. He debuted in Primera División on 3 September against Espanyol Barcelona winning 3–1. At Salamanca he scored 11 goals, being the second leading scorer in the team, but the club finished last and were relegated to Segunda División.

In 1996, Stîngă joined Dutch side PSV Eindhoven. In his first season in the Eredivisie, he played only seven matches. In the 1997–98 season, he was one of the key players for PSV as they finished runners-up in the Dutch Championship. In 1998, he suffered a serious injury, which resulted a year break in the 1998–99 season and appeared once on the pitch. In 2000 and 2001, with PSV Stîngă won two consecutive Dutch Championship titles as well the Dutch Super Cup.

In summer of 2001 he returned to Romania signing with Dinamo Bucharest with whom he won league title. The next two seasons he spent at U.Craiova, returning after 7 years. He was loaned for the 2004–05 season to the Dutch Eerste Divisie side Helmond Sport. In 2006, he was player and manager for U'Craiova in the Romanian second division. He helped his team to get promoted in the first league in the 2006–07 season, before ending his career.

International career
Stîngă made his debut on 31 January 1993 in a friendly game against Ecuador played in Guayaquil. In 1994, he was named in Romania's squad for the World Cup in the United States, but didn't play any game. In 1996, he was called by Anghel Iordănescu at the European Championship in England, where he played one match against Spain. He also represented his country at World Cup 1998 in France.

International stats

Honours

Player
Jiul IELIF Craiova
Divizia C: 1990–91

Universitatea Craiova
Cupa României: 1992–93
Liga II: 2005–06

PSV Eindhoven
Eredivisie: 1996–97, 1999–00, 2000–01 
Dutch Supercup: 1996, 1997, 1998, 2000

Dinamo București
Liga I: 2001–02

Coach
Universitatea Craiova
Liga II: 2005–06

References

External links
 
 

1972 births
Living people
Association football midfielders
Romanian footballers
Romania international footballers
1994 FIFA World Cup players
UEFA Euro 1996 players
1998 FIFA World Cup players
Expatriate footballers in the Netherlands
Expatriate footballers in Spain
Romanian expatriate sportspeople in Spain
Romanian expatriate sportspeople in the Netherlands
CS Universitatea Craiova players
FC U Craiova 1948 players
PSV Eindhoven players
FC Dinamo București players
Helmond Sport players
La Liga players
UD Salamanca players
Liga I players
Romanian expatriate footballers
Eredivisie players
Romanian football managers
CS Universitatea Craiova managers
Sportspeople from Craiova